Whiting is the name of 

powdered and washed white chalk (calcium carbonate), used in metal polish, putty, and whitewash, and sometimes added to paint to improve the paint's opacity

Fish
Merlangius merlangus, the original fish species to receive the name; a common food fish of the cod family found in the northeastern Atlantic Ocean around Europe and the Mediterranean regions
Whiting (fish), various other fish species in North America, Australia and throughout the Indo-Pacific region

Places

In the United States and Canada
Whiting, Indiana
Whiting, Iowa
Whiting, Kansas
Whiting, Maine
Whiting, Missouri
Whiting, New Jersey
Whiting, Vermont
Whiting, Wisconsin
Whiting, Wyoming
Whiting Bay (Maine), US
Whiting Farms, Holyoke, Massachusetts, neighborhood
Whiting Hill, mountain in Dukes County, Massachusetts, US
Whiting Peak (British Columbia), a mountain in British Columbia, Canada
Whiting Ranch Wilderness Park, a hiking location near Lake Forest, California
Whiting River, a river in Alaska and British Columbia
Whiting River (Connecticut), a stream in Massachusetts and Connecticut, US
Whiting Township, North Dakota, in Bowman County, North Dakota, US
Whiting Township, Jackson County, Kansas, US

Elsewhere
Whiting Bay, Isle of Arran, Scotland
Mount Whiting, a pyramidal mountain in Antarctica
Whiting Peak, a scattered group of peaks and nunataks in Antarctica
Whiting Rocks, a three rocks off the coast of Antarctica
Whitings Hill Open Space, a large public open space in Barnet, England

People
Whiting (surname), people with the surname Whiting
Whiting (given name), people with the given name Whiting

Aviation
Naval Air Station Whiting Field, a United States Navy air base in Florida
NAS Whiting Field – North, a section of Naval Air Station Whiting Field
NAS Whiting Field – South, a section of Naval Air Station Whiting Field

Buildings
Whiting Homestead, a house in Connecticut in the United States
Whiting House (disambiguation), the name of many houses in the United States
Whiting Refinery, an oil refinery operated by BP
The Whiting (auditorium), an auditorium in Michigan in the United States

Education
School City of Whiting, a school district headquartered in Whiting, Indiana, in the United States
Whiting School of Engineering, a division of The Johns Hopkins University

Ships
, the name of several ships of the Royal Navy, including:
HMS Whiting, the previous name of the Royal Navy torpedo gunboat 
NOAAS Whiting (S 329), an American survey ship in commission in the National Oceanic and Atmospheric Administration from 1970 to 2003, and previously in commission in the United States Coast and Geodetic Survey from 1963 to 1970 as USC&GS Whiting (CSS 29)
, a United States Navy seaplane tender in commission from 1944 to 1947 and from 1951 to 1958
, a proposed United States Navy submarine cancelled in 1944 prior to construction

Other uses
Chamber of Commerce v. Whiting, a decision by the Supreme Court of the United States
Whiting Motor Car Company, an early American automobile manufacturer in Flint, Michigan, that operated from 1910 to 1912
Whiting reaction, an organic chemical reaction
Whiting Writers' Award, an American award presented annually to ten emerging writers in fiction, nonfiction, poetry, and plays

See also
Whitefish (disambiguation)
Justice Whiting (disambiguation)
Waiting (disambiguation)
Weeting
Weighting
Whitening (disambiguation)
Whitin (disambiguation)
Whitting